Samuel Johnson (1709–1784) was an English literary figure and compiler of A Dictionary of the English Language; often referred to as "Dr. Johnson."

Samuel, Sammy or Sam Johnson may also refer to:

Arts and letters
 Samuel Johnson (dramatist) (1691–1773), author of Hurlothrumbo
 Samuel Johnson (American educator) (1696–1772), American colonial intellectual and educator; first president of King's College (now Columbia University)
 Samuel Johnson (pamphleteer) (1649–1703), English political writer
 Samuel Johnson Jr. (1757–1836), American schoolteacher and lexicographer
 Samuel Johnson (Nigerian historian) (1846–1901), Anglican priest and historian of the Yoruba

Business
 Samuel Curtis Johnson Sr. (1833–1919), American businessman
 Samuel Curtis Johnson Jr. (1928–2004), American businessman
 S. Curtis Johnson or Samuel Curtis Johnson, American businessman

Politics
 Samuel Ealy Johnson Sr. (1838–1915), American businessman, rancher and presidential grandfather
 Samuel Johnson (Michigan politician) (1839–1916), member of the Michigan House of Representatives
 Samuel Ealy Johnson Jr. (1877–1937), Texas politician and presidential father
 Sam Johnson (Oregon politician) (1911–1984), Oregon businessman, legislator, and philanthropist
 Sam Houston Johnson (1914–1978), younger brother of U.S. President Lyndon B. Johnson
 Sam Johnson (1930–2020), Texas congressman
 I. Sam Johnson (1840–1906), American lawyer and politician from New York
 Samuel William Johnson (assemblyman) (1828–1895), American lawyer and politician from New York

Sports
 Samuel Johnson (English footballer) (born 1881)
 Sam Johnson (footballer, born 1901) (1901–1975), English footballer
 Sammy Johnson (American football) (born 1952), American football player
 Sam Johnson (defensive back, born 1959), American player of Canadian football
 Sam Johnson (defensive back, born 1960), American football player
 Sam Johnson (wide receiver) (born 1964), American football player
 Samuel Johnson (footballer, born 1973), Ghanaian football player
 Samuel Johnson (footballer, born 1984), Guinean football player
 Samantha Johnson (born 1991), American soccer player
 Sam Johnson (footballer, born 1992), English football goalkeeper
 Sammie Johnson (born 1992), Australian rules football player
 Sam Johnson (footballer, born 1993), Liberian footballer
 Sam Johnson (rugby union) (born 1993), Australian rugby union player

Other people
 Sam Johnson (colonel), United States Air Force colonel and commander, 21st Space Wing
 Mingo Jack or Samuel Johnson (1820–1886), jockey, lynching victim from New Jersey
 Samuel Johnson (clergyman) (1822–1882), United States clergyman and author
 Samuel Johnson (New Zealand editor) (1827–1905), New Zealand printer, newspaper proprietor and editor
 Samuel William Johnson (1830–1909), United States agricultural chemist
 Samuel Johnson (comedian) (1830–1900), British comedian
 Samuel Waite Johnson (1831–1912), English locomotive engineer
 Samuel D. Johnson Jr. (1920–2002), United States federal judge
 Sammy Johnson (1949–1998), English actor
 Samuel Johnson (actor) (born 1978), Australian actor, radio presenter, voiceover artist and philanthropist
 Sam Johnson (activist) (born 1989), organiser of the Student Volunteer Army
 Samuel Johnson (music producer) (fl. 2008–2010), Australian music producer and engineer
 Sam Johnson, American television producer and writer, part of the Sam Johnson and Chris Marcil writing team

See also
 Samuel Johnson Prize
 Samuel Jackson (disambiguation)
 Samuel Johnston (disambiguation)
 Samantha Johnson (disambiguation)